Steven Ruprecht (born 24 June 1987) is a German footballer.

Career 
Ruprecht began his career in 1994 with Union Berlin and was promoted to the senior side in summer 2005. On 23 December 2008, he left Union Berlin and moved to VfR Aalen. After just a half a year, he left Aalen and signed for FC Ingolstadt. His contract ran over two years. In January 2011, he transferred to Rot-Weiß Oberhausen. before signing for HFC six months later. On 4 June 2013, he signed a two-year contract with Hansa Rostock. After his contract with Hansa had not been renewed in summer 2015, he joined Wehen Wiesbaden on 11 November 2015 after full recovery from a shoulder injury.

On 28 August 2018, he joined Fortuna Köln. In January 2019, he ran into a ankle injury and he was out for one and a half months. He left the club at the end of the season. On 1 September 2019, Ruprecht signed with Borussia Dortmund II for the 2019-20 season.

References

1987 births
Living people
Footballers from Berlin
German footballers
1. FC Union Berlin players
VfR Aalen players
FC Ingolstadt 04 players
Rot-Weiß Oberhausen players
Hallescher FC players
FC Hansa Rostock players
SV Wehen Wiesbaden players
SC Fortuna Köln players
Borussia Dortmund II players
2. Bundesliga players
3. Liga players
Association football defenders